M'Batto (also spelled Mbato) is a town in south-central Ivory Coast. It is a sub-prefecture of and seat of M'Batto Department in Moronou Region, Lacs District. M'Batto is also a commune.

In 2021, the population of the sub-prefecture of M'Batto was 76,129.

Villages
The 13 villages of the sub-prefecture of M'Batto and their population in 2014 are:

References

Sub-prefectures of Moronou Region
Communes of Moronou Region